It Can Be Done is a 1929 American comedy film directed by Fred C. Newmeyer and written by Joseph F. Poland, Earle Snell, Nan Cochrane and Albert DeMond. The film stars Glenn Tryon, Sue Carol, Richard Carlyle, Richard Carle, Jack Egan and Tom O'Brien. The film was released on March 24, 1929, by Universal Pictures.

Plot

Cast        
Glenn Tryon as Jerry Willard
Sue Carol as Anne Rogers
Richard Carlyle as Rogers
Richard Carle as Watson
Jack Egan as Ben Smith
Tom O'Brien as Detective

References

External links
 

1929 films
1920s English-language films
American comedy films
1929 comedy films
Universal Pictures films
Films directed by Fred C. Newmeyer
American black-and-white films
Films with screenplays by Joseph F. Poland
1920s American films